Mohyła – is a Polish coat of arms. It was used by the Movilești family in the times of the Polish–Lithuanian Commonwealth.

History

Blazon

Notable bearers

Notable bearers of this Coat of Arms include:
 Mohyła family (Movilești)

See also

 Polish heraldry
 Heraldry
 Coat of Arms
 List of Polish nobility coats of arms

Sources 
 http://www.jarema.art.pl/M1.gif
 http://ebuw.uw.edu.pl/dlibra/doccontent?id=163

Polish coats of arms